The Kam–Tai languages, also called Dong–Tai or Zhuang–Dong in China, are a proposed primary branch of the Kra–Dai language family. The Kam–Tai grouping is primarily used in China, including by the linguists Liang & Zhang (1996).

Liang & Zhang (1996) classify Kam–Sui, Be, and Tai together as the Dong-Tai 侗台 branch, due to the large number of lexical items shared by all three branches vis-a-vis the more divergent Kra and Hlai branches. Liang & Zhang (1996) also propose a reconstruction of Proto-Kam–Tai.

A Kam–Tai group consisting of Kam–Sui and Tai is accepted by Edmondson & Solnit (1988). Hansell (1988) considers Be to be a sister of the Tai branch based on shared vocabulary, and proposes a Be–Tai grouping within Kam–Tai. This classification is also followed by Norquest (2015).

However, Ostapirat (2005) and various other linguists do not make use of the Kam–Tai grouping.

History
Liang & Zhang (1996:18) estimate that the Kam-Sui, Tai, and Hlai branches had already formed by about 5,000 years B.P.

Reconstruction
Proto-Kam-Tai has been reconstructed by Liang & Zhang (1996), drawing data from the Tai, Kam-Sui, Be, Lakkia, Biao, and Hlai branches but not the Kra branch. Wu (2002) presents a reconstruction of Proto-Kra-Dai, which is based on data from the Tai, Kam-Sui, Hlai, and Kra branches.

References

Edmondson, J. A., & Solnit, D. B. (eds.) (1988). Comparative Kadai: linguistic studies beyond Tai. Summer Institute of Linguistics publications in linguistics, no. 86. Arlington, TX: Summer Institute of Linguistics. 
Liang Min 梁敏 & Zhang Junru 张均如. 1996. Dongtai yuzu gailun 侗台语族概论 / An introduction to the Kam–Tai languages. Beijing: China Social Sciences Academy Press 中国社会科学出版社. 
Ni Dabai 倪大白. 1990. Dongtai yu gailun 侗台语概论 / An introduction to the Kam-Tai languages. Beijing: Central Nationalities Research Institute Press 中央民族学院出版社.

Kra–Dai languages